Tonna Rugby Football Club is a rugby union team from the village of Tonna, Wales. Tonna RFC is a member of the Welsh Rugby Union and is a feeder club for the Ospreys.

History
Although it is believed that Tonna RFC existed before 1888, the club was first mentioned during the 1887/88 season, when the Cambria Daily Reader stated that Tonna RFC were drawn to play Mynydd-bach in the local Neath cup challenge. It is therefore regarded that Tonna RFC came into being on 28 February 1888.

Tonna RFC's first international player was David Harris Davies. Although he played for Neath RFC at the time of his one and only cap against Scotland in 1904, he came through the playing ranks of Tonna.

The club disbanded after the outbreak of the First World War, but reformed as Dulais United after the war ended. This team was an amalgamation of local villages Tonna, Aberdulais, Cadoxton, and Cilfrew but the team was still housed in Tonna.

Notable players
Full Senior Internationals
  David Harris Davies - Neath RFC (1 cap)
  Arthur Lemon - Neath RFC (13 caps)
  Martyn Davies - Neath RFC (1 Cap)
   Alan Edmunds- Aberavon RFC,Neath RFC (2 caps)
  Craig Mitchell  Neath RFC, Ospreys, Exeter Chiefs, Cardiff Blues, Newport Gwent Dragons, Bath (15 caps)
  Leigh Davies   Neath RFC, Cardiff RFC, Bristol RFC, Ospreys, Llanelli Scarlets (Captain) - 21 Caps

  Doug Phillips (rugby) Douglas V Phillips Rugby League International Oldham RLFC, Broughton Park Rangers RLFC Belle Vue RLFC. 9 Wales RL Caps & 4 Great Britain Caps (including 1950 Series win in Australia)

 Barbarians RFC  Martyn Davies (Neath RFC), Chris Gittins (Aberavon RFC)

References

External links
 https://web.archive.org/web/20130206182838/http://www.pitchero.com/clubs/tonnarfc

Welsh rugby union teams
1888 establishments in Wales
Rugby clubs established in 1888
Rugby union in Neath Port Talbot